Willie Bernard Jackson Jr. (born August 16, 1971) is a former American professional football wide receiver in the National Football League (NFL) for the Dallas Cowboys, Jacksonville Jaguars, Cincinnati Bengals, New Orleans Saints, Atlanta Falcons and Washington Redskins. He played college football at the University of Florida. As a football coach, he was the wide receivers coach for the Orlando Apollos of the Alliance of American Football (AAF).

Early years 

Jackson was born in Gainesville, Florida in 1971. He attended P. K. Yonge High School in Gainesville, where he was standout high school football player for the P. K. Yonge Blue Wave.

He played as a quarterback, running back, wingback and defensive back. He received All-state honors as a senior, rushing for 427 yards and making 27 receptions.

College career 

Jackson accepted a football scholarship to attend the University of Florida in Gainesville, where he played for coach Steve Spurrier's Florida Gators football team from 1990 to 1993. After being redshirted, he appeared in 5 games as a freshman but did not record a reception.

As a sophomore, he posted 51 receptions (second in the conference) for 725 yards and 10 touchdowns (led the conference and tied for the second most ever in school history). Against Auburn University he had career-highs of 12 receptions (tied for the second most ever in school history) and 157 yards. Against the University of Georgia, he became the fifth player in school history to make 3 touchdown receptions in one game. In the 1992 Sugar Bowl against the University of Notre Dame, he had the second best total yardage in Gators bowl history, with 8 receptions for 148 yards.

As a junior, he had one of the best receiving seasons in school history, posting 62 receptions (led the conference and were the third most ever in school history), 772 yards (led the conference and were the fifth most ever in school history) and 8 touchdowns, including a career-high 70-yard touchdown reception in the SEC Championship game against the University of Alabama.

As a senior, he started only 9 games and missed the game against the University of Tennessee with a sprained left knee. He finished second on the team with 49 receptions for 675 yards and 6 touchdowns.

Jackson led the team in receiving in 1991 and 1992, and was a first-team All-Southeastern Conference (SEC) selection in 1992, and an honorable mention All-American in 1991, 1992 and 1993.  Memorably, he had 148 receiving yards against the Notre Dame Fighting Irish in the 1992 Sugar Bowl and 130 yards against the West Virginia Mountaineers in the 1994 Sugar Bowl.

Jackson finished his college career with 162 receptions (second in school history) for 2,172 yards (second in school history) and twenty-four touchdowns—still fifth on the Gators' all-time receiving yardage list. He also walked-on to the Florida Gators men's basketball team in the 1989-90 season, averaging 3 points per game and making 20 steals.

He graduated from Florida with a bachelor's degree in telecommunications in 1993, and was inducted into the University of Florida Athletic Hall of Fame as a "Gator Great" in 2008.

Professional career 

Jackson was selected by the  Dallas Cowboys in the fourth round (109th pick overall) of the 1994 NFL Draft. After being inactive during all of the  season, he asked the team to leave him unprotected in the 1995 NFL Expansion Draft, so he could get an opportunity to play in another place and not be a reserve behind Michael Irvin.

In , the NFL's two new expansion teams, the Carolina Panthers and the Jacksonville Jaguars, participated in the 1995 NFL Expansion Draft, an opportunity to pick available players from the rosters of the existing NFL teams. The Jaguars picked Jackson from the Cowboys' unprotected list as the twenty-first overall pick in the expansion draft. In their inaugural season, he led the team in receiving with 53 receptions for 589 yards and 5 touchdowns, while starting in 10 contests. In , he posted 33 receptions (fifth on the team) for 486 yards (fourth on the team) and 3 receiving touchdowns (tied for second on the team). In , his stats diminished, coinciding with the explosion in the production of wide receivers Jimmy Smith and Keenan McCardell. He was waived on August 30, . He compiled 103 catches for 1,281 yards and ten touchdowns during his time with the club.

Jackson signed with the Cincinnati Bengals on September 10, . He was declared inactive in 6 games. In , he ranked third on the team with 31 receptions for 369 yards and 2 touchdowns.

On April 2, he signed as a free agent with the New Orleans Saints. He started the last 6 games of the season, he ranked third on the team with 37 receptions for 523 yards and 6 touchdowns. In , he ranked second on the team with eighty-one catches for 1,046 yards and five touchdowns in sixteen starts.

On July 12, he signed with the Atlanta Falcons taking the place of the previously released Jeff Graham. He saw little playing time and was waived on October 28, 2002.

On October 31, 2002, he signed with the Washington Redskins, reuniting with his former college coach, Steve Spurrier, then head coach of the team. He appeared in 5 games with one start and was cut on December 12.

On March 12, he signed with the Denver Broncos and was released before the season started on August 17.

Jackson finished his eight-season NFL career with 284 receptions for 3,641 yards and twenty-four touchdowns.

Coaching career 
In November 2018, Jackson was hired by his former college head coach Steve Spurrier as the wide receivers coach for the Orlando Apollos of the Alliance of American Football. He remained with the team until the league folded.

Personal life

His father, Willie Jackson Sr., led the Gators in all-purpose yards and kick-off returns in the early 1970s, and was one of the team's first two African-American players at the University of Florida. All three Jacksons wore jersey No. 22 for the Gators.

See also 

 Florida Gators football, 1990–99
 List of Dallas Cowboys players
 List of Florida Gators in the NFL Draft
 List of New Orleans Saints players
 List of University of Florida alumni
 List of University of Florida Athletic Hall of Fame members
 List of Washington Redskins players

References

Bibliography 

 Carlson, Norm, University of Florida Football Vault: The History of the Florida Gators, Whitman Publishing, LLC, Atlanta, Georgia (2007).  .
 Golenbock, Peter, Go Gators!  An Oral History of Florida's Pursuit of Gridiron Glory, Legends Publishing, LLC, St. Petersburg, Florida (2002).  .
 Hairston, Jack, Tales from the Gator Swamp: A Collection of the Greatest Gator Stories Ever Told, Sports Publishing, LLC, Champaign, Illinois (2002).  .
 McCarthy, Kevin M.,  Fightin' Gators: A History of University of Florida Football, Arcadia Publishing, Mount Pleasant, South Carolina (2000).  .
 Nash, Noel, ed., The Gainesville Sun Presents The Greatest Moments in Florida Gators Football, Sports Publishing, Inc., Champaign, Illinois (1998).  .

1971 births
Living people
Players of American football from Gainesville, Florida
Sportspeople from Gainesville, Florida
American football wide receivers
Atlanta Falcons players
Cincinnati Bengals players
Dallas Cowboys players
Florida Gators football players
Florida Gators men's basketball players
Jacksonville Jaguars players
New Orleans Saints players
Washington Redskins players
American men's basketball players
Orlando Apollos coaches